Evelio Calderín (January 25, 1896 – death unknown) was a Cuban pitcher in the Negro leagues  between 1917 and 1924. 

A native of Havana, Cuba, Calderín made his Negro leagues debut in 1917 with the Cuban Stars. He played for the Stars the following two seasons, then returned to the Stars to finish his career in 1924.

References

External links
 and Baseball-Reference Black Baseball stats and Seamheads

1896 births
Place of death missing
Year of death missing
Cuban Stars (East) players
Baseball pitchers
Baseball players from Havana
Cuban expatriate baseball players in the United States